Calkins Media, Inc. was a media company. Established in 1937, Calkins Media brands included daily newspapers and digital sites in Pennsylvania and New Jersey, a weekly newspaper in South Dade, Fla., and broadcast stations located in Huntsville, Ala., Tallahassee and Sarasota, Fla. Corporate and digital headquarters were located in Bucks County, Pa.

In 2016, Raycom Media agreed to purchase Calkins Media's three television stations. A sale of WAAY-TV to Raycom affiliate American Spirit Media was blocked by the Department of Justice due to Raycom's ownership of WAFF. Raycom closed on the purchase of WWSB and WTXL-TV on May 1, 2017, while WAAY-TV was instead sold to Heartland Media.

In 2017, GateHouse Media and Ogden Newspapers agreed to terms to purchase Calkins Media's newspaper assets.

Former Calkins Media assets

Newspapers
The Beaver County Times - (now owned by Gannett)
Bucks County Courier Times - (PA) - (now owned by Gannett)
Burlington County Times (NJ) - (now owned by Gannett)
Ellwood City Ledger - (now owned by Gannett)
Greene County Messenger - (now owned by Ogden Newspapers)
(Uniontown, PA) The Herald-Standard - (now owned by Ogden Newspapers)
South Dade News Leader - (now owned by South Dade News, Inc.)
The Intelligencer (Doylestown, Pennsylvania) - (now owned by Gannett)

Television stations
Stations arranged alphabetically by state and by city of license.

Note:
1 The station is licensed to Sarasota, which is part of the Tampa market. However, WWSB does not serve all of the Tampa/St. Petersburg area as the ABC affiliate (WFTS serves the Tampa metro area, WWSB serves the southern portion of the market). The station also serves portions of the Fort Myers market.

Footnotes

Companies based in Philadelphia
Publishing companies established in 1937
Defunct television broadcasting companies of the United States
Defunct newspaper companies of the United States
1937 establishments in the United States
Publishing companies disestablished in 2017
Privately held companies based in Pennsylvania
Gannett